Screen International is a British film magazine covering the international film business. It is published by Media Business Insight, a British B2B media company.

The magazine is primarily aimed at those involved in the global film business. The magazine in its current form was founded in 1975, and its website, Screendaily.com, was added in 2001.

Screen International also produces daily publications at film festivals and markets in Berlin, Germany; Cannes, France; Toronto, Ontario, Canada; the American Film Market in Santa Monica, California; and Hong Kong.

History 
Screen International traces its history back to 1889 with the publication of Optical Magic Lantern and Photographic Enlarger. At the turn of the 20th century, the name changed to Cinematographic Journal  and in 1907 it was renamed Kinematograph and Lantern Weekly.

Kinematograph Weekly
Kinematograph and Lantern Weekly contained trade news, advertisements, reviews, exhibition advice, and reports of regional and national meetings of trade organisations such as the Cinematograph Exhibitors' Association and the Kinema Renters' Society. It was first published by pioneering film enthusiast, industrialist and printing entrepreneur E. T. Heron. In 1919 it was renamed Kinematograph Weekly which was further shortened in 1959 to Kine Weekly.

The title was sold to British and American Film Holdings Ltd in September 1971, which merged it with rival film-trade paper Today's Cinema. It was later renamed CinemaTV Today.

Launch of Screen International
In 1975, Peter King purchased the struggling CinemaTV Today from Sir John Woolf for £50,000 and relaunched the publication as Screen International. The first issue of Screen International was published on 6 September 1975. King sold the publication in 1989 to the International Thomson Organization.

Many Screen International journalists have gone on to become major industry figures, including Colin Vaines, who ran production for companies such as Miramax and GK Films, and who has produced many award-winning film and television projects.

Screen Daily (website)
In addition to its print magazine, Screen International maintains Screen Daily website, providing a real-time view of the film industry.

Editors
The editors of Screen International include:
 Peter Noble (1975-1979)
 Quentin Falk, Editor (1979–1982)
 Colin Vaines, Co-Editor (1982–83)
 Adrian Hodges, Co-Editor (1982–83)
 Terry Ilott, Editor (1983–87)
 Nick Roddick, Editor (1987–88)
 Oscar Moore (1991-1994)
 Boyd Farrow, Editor (1995–98)
 Colin Brown, Editor-in-Chief (1998–2008)
 Michael Gubbins, Editor (2004–09)
 Mike Goodridge, Editor (2009–2012)
 Wendy Mitchell, Editor (2012–14)
 Matt Mueller, Editor (2015–present)

Offices
Screen International has offices in:

 Hong Kong
 London, United Kingdom
 Los Angeles, California, United States
 New York City, New York, United States

It has a network of more than forty correspondents around the world. It hosts conferences, including the annual European Film Finance Summit in Berlin and the UK Film Finance Conference in London.

Oscar Moore Foundation
A former editor in chief, Oscar Moore—who was also a columnist for The Guardian and a novelist—died of an AIDS-related illness in 1996. The Oscar Moore Foundation was established in 1997 as a charitable foundation administered by Screen International. The foundation's aim is to foster new European screenwriting talent by awarding an annual prize of £10,000 to the best first draft screenplay in a genre which changes each year. A foundation patron, Emma Thompson, is an actress and screenwriter who has won an Academy Award for both disciplines.

Screen International Stars of Tomorrow 
One of Screen International's most influential areas of work is its international talent spotting under the Stars of Tomorrow brand. A special edition of the magazine to highlight up-and-coming talent was established in 2004 in the UK. Since 2010, Stars of Tomorrow has been curated by Fionnuala Halligan, Screen chief film critic.

2000s

2010s

2020s

Competition 
The magazine's international competitors include its American counterparts Variety and The Hollywood Reporter.

See also
 List of film periodicals

References

External links
 
 Media Business Insight

1889 establishments in the United Kingdom
Film magazines published in the United Kingdom
Magazines published in London
Magazines established in 1889
Professional and trade magazines